The eleventh Altazor Awards took place on April 27, 2010, at the Teatro Teletón.

Nominations

Literary Arts

Narrative
Jaime Collyer  – La fidelidad presunta de las partes
Mauricio Electorat  – Las Islas que van quedando
José Miguel Varas  – La Huachita

Poetry
Pablo Azócar  – El placer de los demás
Efraín Barquero  – Pacto de sangre
Claudio Bertoni  – Piden sangre por las puras

Essay
José Bengoa  – La comunidad fragmentada. Nación y desigualdad en Chile
Poli Délano  – Memorias Neoyorkinas
Adriana Valdés  – Enrique Lihn: vistas parciales

Visual Arts

Painting
Omar Gatica  – Yo, pintor
Matías Pinto D´Aguiar  – En la muestra colectiva Homenaje a Pablo Domínguez
Andrés Vío  – Mano de obra

Sculpture
Federico Assler  – 40 años
Francisco Gazitúa  – Blanco y negro
Pilar Ovalle  – Natura Vincit

Engraving and Drawing
Valentina Cruz  – Entre líneas y sombras
Teresa Gazitúa  – Tiempo Grabado
Patricia Israel  – Libro Cuerpos Impresos

Installation art and Video art
Nury González  – Sueño velado, en la muestra colectiva El terremoto de Chile
Cristóbal Lehyt  – El Penúltimo Paisaje
Alicia Villarreal  – Grabar el Territorio, en la muestra colectiva Territorios de Estado: Paisaje y Cartografía de Chile, Siglo XIX

Photography
Antonia Cruz  – Catalepsia
Luis Ladrón de Guevara  – Desde la fotografía industrial hacia una estética de la producción
Helen Hughes, Kena Lorenzini and Leonora Vicuña  – Visible/invisible

Graphic design and Illustration
Alberto Montt  – Libro Recetas al pie de la letra
Jenny Abud, Mauricio Vico and Mario Osses  – Libro Un grito en la pared, psicodelia, compromiso político y exilio en el cartel chileno
Mariana Muñoz and Fernanda Villalobos  – Libro Alejandro Fauré, Obra gráfica

Performing Arts Theatre

Dramaturgy
Luis Barrales  – La mala clase
Jaime McManus  – El avión rojo
Creación colectiva de Tryo teatro banda  – Pedro de Valdivia: La gesta inconclusa

Actor
Miguel Ángel Bravo  – Diario de un loco
Luis Gnecco  – Pérez
Ramón Núñez  – Pana

Actress
Emilia Noguera  – Pana
Gloria Münchmeyer  – Días Contados
Paula Zúñiga  – Diciembre

Performing Arts Dance

Choreography
Isabel Croxatto  – Narciso el extasiado
Oscar Ramírez  – Violeta del Alma
Eduardo Yedro  – Un solo para dos

Male Dancer
Jorge Carreño  – Verdi- Requiem
César Sepúlveda  – Verdi- Requiem
José Luis Tejo  – Arde el piso II

Female Dancer
Carola Alvear  – Verdi- Requiem
Carmen Aros  – Lo que me dio el agua
Kana Nakao  – Verdi- Requiem

Musical Arts

Classical music
Andrés Ferrari  – Optikalis 03
Alejandro Guarello  – Retri
Aliocha Solovera  – Solo para un diálogo

Traditional music
Nano Acevedo  – Juegos tradicionales chilenos
Illapu  – Vivo
Daniel Muñoz, Félix Llancafil and 3x7 Veintiuna  – Al compás del 6 x 8

Pop
Américo  – A Morir
De Kiruza  – Música pa´l mundo
Difuntos Correa  – Ilusionismo

Rock
Fiskales Ad-Hok  – 12
La Floripondio  – 15 Años… ¡¡Sin Niun Brillo!!
Sinergia  – El Imperio de la Estupidez

Jazz
Agustín Moya  – Infinito
Felipe Riveros Trío  – Santiago
Sebastián Jordán Quinteto  – Afluencia

Playing
Leo Ahumada (Guitar)
Lautaro Quevedo (Piano)
Freddy Torrealba (Charango)

Media Arts Film

Director Fiction
Alejandro Fernández  – Huacho
Alicia Scherson  – Turistas
Sebastián Silva  – La Nana

Director Documentary
Samuel León González  – Riquelme
Francisco Hervé  – El poder de la palabra
Juan Ignacio Sabatini  – Juan Downey

Screenplay
Sebastián Silva and Pedro Peirano  – La Nana
Cristián Jiménez and Alicia Scherson  – Ilusiones ópticas
Alejandro Fernández  – Huacho

Actor
Luis Dubó  – Dawson, Isla 10
Alejandro Goic  – La Nana
Pablo Krögh  – Dawson, Isla 10

Actress
Claudia Celedón  – La Nana
Anita Reeves  – La Nana
Catalina Saavedra  – La Nana

Media Arts TV

Director Drama
Rodrigo Díaz  – Infieles
María Eugenia Rencoret  – ¿Dónde está Elisa?
Boris Quercia  – Los 80

Director TV Show
Pablo Lavín  – La Travesía de Darwin
Cristián Leighton  – Santiago no es Chile
Pedro Vergara  – TV o no TV

Screenplay
Rodrigo Cuevas  – Los 80
Original idea by Pablo Illanes with Nona Fernández, Hugo Morales and Josefina Fernández  – ¿Dónde está Elisa?
Original idea by Rodrigo Ossandón, Felipe Ossandón, Jorge Ayala and Juan Elgueta. Screenplay by Pablo Illanes, Francisca Bernardi, Juan Pablo Olave and Nona Fernández  – Conde Vrolok

Actor
Francisco Melo  – ¿Dónde está Elisa?
Daniel Muñoz  – Los 80
Álvaro Rudolphy  – ¿Dónde está Elisa?

Actress
Tamara Acosta  – Los 80
Sigrid Alegría  – ¿Dónde está Elisa?
Paola Volpato  – ¿Dónde está Elisa?

References

Chilean awards